Dihydrofluoxymesterone (developmental code name U-7265) is an androgen and anabolic steroid (AAS) which was never marketed. It was assessed in the treatment of breast cancer in women in at least one clinical study in the 1970s and showed effectiveness similar to that of other AAS. The drug is the 5α-reduced analogue and metabolite of fluoxymesterone.

See also
 Oxofluoxymesterone

References

5α-Reduced steroid metabolites
Abandoned drugs
Cyclohexanols
1-Methylcyclopentanols
Androgens and anabolic steroids
Androstanes
Hepatotoxins
Hormonal antineoplastic drugs
Human drug metabolites
Ketones
Organofluorides